Montmartre is a 1925 French silent drama film directed by Charles Burguet and starring Gaby Morlay, Camille Bardou, and Maurice Schutz. It was remade in 1931 as a sound film, Montmartre, with Morlay reprising her role.

Cast

References

Bibliography

External links

1925 films
Films directed by Charles Burguet
French silent feature films
French black-and-white films
French drama films
1925 drama films
Silent drama films
1920s French films
1920s French-language films